Lukavci (in older sources Lokavci) is a village in the Municipality of Križevci in northeastern Slovenia. It lies just off the regional road leading northwest from Ljutomer to Radenci. The area is part of the traditional region of Styria. The entire municipality is now included in the Mura Statistical Region.

A small Neo-Gothic chapel in the settlement was built in 1872.

References

External links
Lukavci on Geopedia

Populated places in the Municipality of Križevci